The Bhagalpur blindings refers to a series of incidents in 1979 and 1980 in Bhagalpur in the state of Bihar, India when police blinded 31 individuals under trial (or convicted criminals, according to some versions) by pouring acid into their eyes. The incident became infamous as the Bhagalpur blindings. The incident was widely discussed, debated and acutely criticised by several human rights organisations. The Bhagalpur blinding case had made criminal jurisprudence history by becoming the first in which the Indian Supreme Court ordered compensation for violation of basic human rights.

In popular culture

The Bollywood movie Gangaajal is loosely based on this incident.

Amitabh Parashar's documentary "The Eyes of Darkness" was inspired by this incident, documenting blindings as they continue even today.

See also
List of cases of police brutality in India

References

External links
 "Blind rage and anguish, 30 yrs on", The Times of India
  "GangaaJal" Unstitches Wounds of Baghalpur Blinding,  Syed Ali Mujtaba, Indolink

History of Bihar (1947–present)
Police misconduct in India
Bhagalpur
Bhagalpur
Crime in Bihar
Acid attack victims
Police brutality in India